Agrotis simplonia is a moth of the family Noctuidae. It is found in the Alps, Pyrenees, the Cantabrian Mountains and the Apennine Mountains on heights between 1,200 and 3,000 meters.

The wingspan is 32–40 mm. Adults are on wing from May to October.

The larvae feed on various grasses.

Taxonomy
The Spanish population was described as a separate species Agrotis coralita by Hospital in 1948.  This is now considered a synonym.

References

External links 

Funet Taxonomy
www.lepiforum.de
www.schmetterlinge-deutschlands.de

Agrotis
Moths of Europe
Moths described in 1832
Taxa named by Carl Geyer